Derschen is a municipality in the district of Altenkirchen, in Rhineland-Palatinate, Germany.

Its highest point is at 400 meters above sea level.

References

Altenkirchen (district)